is the 49th single by Japanese idol girl group AKB48. It was released in Japan on 30 August 2017.

The single sold 1,036,551 physical copies on its first day according to Oricon.

Track listings 
All lyrics by Yasushi Akimoto.

Type A

Type B

Type C

Type D

Type E

Theater edition

Personnel  

Sukinanda

Center: Sashihara Rino

AKB48 Team A: Yui Yokoyama(7)
AKB48 Team B: Mayu Watanabe(2) 
AKB48 Team 4: Nana Okada(9), Juri Takahashi(11)
HKT48: Rino Sashihara(1), Sakura Miyawaki(4)
SKE48: Jurina Matsui(3), Akari Suda(6), Sarina Sōda(8), Nao Furuhata(14), Akane Takayanagi(15)
NGT48: Yuka Ogino(5), Rie Kitahara(10), Hinata Homma(13)
NMB48: Miru Shiroma(12), Akari Yoshida(16)

"Darashinai Aishikata"
Undergirls (アンダーガールズ) (16 Members) (Mion Mukaichi Center)

Team K: Minegishi Minami, Mion Mukaichi
Team B: Kato Rena, Fukuoka Seina
Team 4: Kawamoto Saya, Kojima Mako
Team 8: Kuranoo Narumi
Team S: Oya Masana
Team KII: Mina Oba, Matsumura Kaori
Team N: Suto Ririka
Team BII: Ota Yuuri
Team H: Tanaka Miku
Team KIV: Moriyasu Madoka
Team NIII: Takakura Moeka, Nakai Rika

"Tomadotte Tameratte"
Next Girls (ネクストガールズ) (16 Members) (Kato Yuuka Center)

Team A: Sasaki Yukari, Taniguchi Megu
Team 4: Iwatate Saho
AKB48 Kenkyuusei: Kubo Satone
Team KII: Yuna Ego
Team E: Kamata Natsuki, Goto Rara
Team M: Yuuka Kato
Team BII: Okita Ayaka, Murase Sae
Team H: Tashima Meru, Yabuki Nako
Team KIV: Tomiyoshi Asuka, Tomonaga Mio, Fuchigami Mai
Team NIII: Nishigata Marina

"Jibuntachi no Koi ni Kagitte"
Future Girls (フューチャーガールズ) (16 Members) (Sakaguchi Riko Center)

Team 4: Komiyama Haruka
Team 8: Oguri Yui
AKB48 Kenkyuusei: Muto Orin
Team S: Kitagawa Ryoha
Team KII: Arai Yuki, Takeuchi Saki
Team E: Kumazaki Haruka
Team N: Ichikawa Miori, Tanigawa Airi
Team M: Shibuya Nagisa
Team H: Sakaguchi Riko, Tanaka Natsumi, Matsuoka Natsumi
Team KIV: Ueki Nao, Motomura Aoi
Team NIII: Maho Yamaguchi

"Tsuki no Kamen"
Upcoming Girls (アップカミングガールズ) (16 Members) (Ota Nao Center)

Team A: Hiwatashi Yui
Team K: Mogi Shinobu
Team B: Goto Moe
Team 4: Omori Miyuu
Team 8: Ota Nao, Sakaguchi Nagisa, Nagano Serika
Team KII: Obata Yuna
Team E: Sato Sumire, Takahata Yuki, Tani Marika
Team TII: Matsuoka Hana
HKT48 Kenkyuusei: Toyonaga Aki
Team NIII: Kato Minami
NGT48 Kenkyuusei: Kado Yuria, Miyajima Aya

"Private Summer" 
SHOWROOM Senbatsu (SHOWROOM選抜) (16 Members) (Onishi Momoka Center)

Team B: Ma Chia-Ling
Team 8: Ota Nao, Onishi Momoka, Sato Shiori, Shimoaoki Karin
AKB48 Kenkyuusei: Yamane Suzuha
SKE48 Kenkyuusei: Nonogaki Miki
Team N: Naiki Kokoro
Team NIII: Ogino Yuka, Nakai Rika, Nishigata Marina
NGT48 Kenkyuusei: Nakamura Ayuka, Nara Miharu
STU: Sano Haruka, Fukuda Akari, Mori Kaho

"Give Up wa Shinai"
Tofu Pro Wrestling (豆腐プロレス) (9 Members) (Hollywood JURINA & Cherry Miyawaki Centers)

Team A: Long Speech Yokoyama Yui
Team K: Jumbo Haruka Shimada, Blackberry Mion Mukaichi
Team B: Papparra Kizaki Yuria, Cutie Renacchi Kato Rena
Team S: Hollywood JURINA Matsui Jurina
Team KII: Sax Nao Furuhata
Team M: Doutonbori Miru Shiroma
Team KIV: Cherry Sakura Miyawaki

"Dakitsukouka?"
16th Generation (16期生) (18 Members) (Asai Nanami & Yamauchi Mizuki Center)

Kenkyuusei: Asai Nanami, Inagaki Kaori, Umemoto Izumi, Kurosu Haruka, Sato Minami, Shoji Nagisa, Suzuki Kurumi, Taguchi Manaka, Taya Misaki, Nagatomo Ayami, Harima Nanami, Homma Mai, Maeda Ayaka, Michieda Saki, Muto Orin, Yasuda Kana, Yamauchi Mizuki, Yamane Suzuha

Release history

References

External links 
 Profile on the AKB48 official website 

AKB48 songs
2017 singles
2017 songs
Songs with lyrics by Yasushi Akimoto
King Records (Japan) singles
Oricon Weekly number-one singles
Billboard Japan Hot 100 number-one singles